The Nootka Fault is an active transform fault running southwest from Nootka Island, near Vancouver Island, British Columbia, Canada.

Geology
The Nootka Fault lies between the Explorer Plate in the north and Juan de Fuca Plate in south. These are remnants of the once vast Farallon Plate. The fault is at the triple junction of the North American, Explorer, and Juan de Fuca plates.

Near the Nootka Fault is an active undersea mud volcano named Maquinna.

Footnotes

Bibliography

Further reading

Plate tectonics
Seismic faults of British Columbia
South Coast of British Columbia
Oceanography of Canada